Pamana may refer to:

Pamana Island, Indonesia
Pamana language or Kagwahiva language, a Tupi–Guarani dialect cluster of Brazil
Pamana (TV series), a Filipino educational series beginning in 2001
"Pamana", the first part of the 2012 Filipino film Shake, Rattle and Roll XIV : The Invasion
Pamana, a 2018 Filipino television film produced by TAPE Inc.

See also
Gedhe Pamanahan, the first ruler of the Sultanate of Mataram
Panama (disambiguation)